LC2 or LC-2 may refer to:

 Cape Canaveral Air Force Station Launch Complex 2, a deactivated US Air Force launch site
 Lancia LC2, a series of racing cars
 LC, Swansea or LC2, a leisure centre in Swansea, South Wales
 LC2 (classification), a para-cycling classification
 LC-2, a chair designed by architect Le Corbusier
 Macintosh LC II, an early 1990s era computer manufactured by Apple Computer
 Vandenberg AFB Space Launch Complex 2, an active rocket launch site in California, USA
 Xichang Launch Complex 2, an active rocket launch site in the People's Republic of China

See also

 Launch Complex 2 (disambiguation)
 LCII (disambiguation)
 LCLC (disambiguation)
 LCC (disambiguation)
 
 
 IC2 (disambiguation)

 LC (disambiguation)